News is new information, typically relating to current events.

News or The News may also refer to:

Arts and entertainment

Film, television and theatre
 The News (film), a 1989 Indian Malayalam film
 News (film), a 2005 Indian Kannada film
 The News (musical), a 1985 Broadway musical
 "The News" (The Amazing World of Gumball), a television episode

Music

Performers
 NEWS (band), a J-pop band
 Huey Lewis and the News, an American rock band

Albums
 News (album), by News, 2013
 N.E.W.S. (Golden Earring album), 1984
 N·E·W·S (Prince album), 2003
 News (EP), by Tokyo Jihen, 2020
 The News, an EP by Carbon/Silicon, 2006

Songs
 "News", by Dire Straits from Communiqué, 1979
 "The News" (Paramore song), 2022
 "The News", by PartyNextDoor from Partymobile, 2020
 "The News", by Train from A Girl, a Bottle, a Boat, 2017

Companies and organizations
 News (publishing), an Austrian publisher of news magazines
 News Corporation (1980–2013), a media conglomerate
 News International, British subsidiary
 News Limited, Australian subsidiary
 Network of European Worldshops, a network of national associations of worldshops

Computing
A News or news, a program for serving and reading Usenet newsgroups
News (Apple), news reader software bundled with iOS
NeWS (Network extensible Window System), developed by Sun Microsystems in the mid 1980s
Sony NEWS, a computer workstation

Newspapers and magazines

North America
 News (National Library Service for the Blind and Physically Handicapped), a quarterly magazine published by the U.S. Library of Congress
 The News (Chicago), Illinois, US
 The News (Mexico City), a Mexican English-language newspaper
 The News (New Glasgow), a daily newspaper serving New Glasgow and Pictou County, Nova Scotia, Canada
 The News, of Frederick, Maryland, absorbed in 2002 into the Frederick News-Post
 The Greenville News, Greenville, South Carolina, US
 The Port Arthur News (nicknamed "The News"), Port Arthur, Texas, US
 The Temple News (formerly nicknamed "The News"), Philadelphia, Pennsylvania, US
 Bangor Daily News (sometimes called "The News"), Bangor, Maine, US

Europe
 NEWS (Austrian magazine), Austrian news magazine
 News (newspaper), defunct newspaper based Zürich, Switzerland
 The News (Portsmouth), newspaper in Portsmouth, England
 Le News, English-language free weekly newspaper published in Switzerland.
 The News, Spanish newspaper published by The News Media Group

Other places
 The News (Adelaide), South Australia
 The News, a newspaper in Alexandra, New Zealand
 The News International, Pakistan (Karachi, Lahore and Islamabad)

People
William Carver (Wild Bunch) (1868–1901), nicknamed "News", American Old West outlaw
P. N. News, Paul Neu (born 1966), American professional wrestler

See also

A News (TV series), local newscasts on the A television system in Canada
Noos (disambiguation)
New (disambiguation)